The 2013–14 Washington Huskies men's basketball team represented the University of Washington in the 2013–14 NCAA Division I men's basketball season. The huskies led by twelfth year head coach Lorenzo Romar. The Huskies played their home games at Alaska Airlines Arena at Hec Edmundson Pavilion as members of the Pac-12 Conference.

Departures

Recruits

Roster

Depth chart

Coaching staff

Schedule

|-
!colspan=12 style="background:#363c74; color:#e8d3a2;"| Exhibition

|-
!colspan=12 style="background:#363c74; color:#e8d3a2;"| Non-conference regular season

|-
!colspan=12 style="background:#363c74;"| Pac-12 regular season

|-
!colspan=12 style="background:#363c74;"| 2014 Pac-12 Tournament

References

See also
2013–14 Washington Huskies women's basketball team

Washington Huskies
Washington Huskies men's basketball seasons
Washington
Washington